Knott County Central High School is a high school located in Hindman, Kentucky.

It is home to the Knott County Central Patriots, who have claimed several regional titles in basketball, baseball, track, and other sports.

History
The school was founded in 1974 by a consolidation of three smaller county schools: Hindman High School, Carr Creek High School (both state basketball champions), and Knott County High School. This made the first graduating class, the class of 1975. At this time the school was not equipped with the space for a baseball team nor a football team. These extra-curricular activities came at a later time. The lower spot cleared off to the left of the school was only used to practice the marching band routines. The Marching Patriots earned several awards in marching and in stage band the first few years that the school was opened.

Activities
The school's speech team, which has 21 regional titles, has captured the KHSSL (Kentucky High School Speech League) State Championship in 2004 and 2005, as well as The Smokey Mountain National Invitational Championship 4 times, the most recent being 2009.

In March 2010 the Knott County Central High School's boys' basketball team claimed the 14th region championship title, taking them to the state tournament for the first time in 17 years.  In 2011, the boys' basketball team made history once again by winning the school's first ever Lexington Invitational title (iHigh Invitational) as well as the school's first WYMT Mountain Classic Championship.  The 2011–2012 boys' basketball team went on to win the 2012 14th Region Championship and advanced to the quarterfinals of the 2012 Kentucky Sweet 16 Boys Basketball State Tournament.

In 2012, Knott County Central's cheerleaders were named the State In-Game Champions at the 2012 Kentucky Sweet 16 Boys Basketball State Tournament, marking the first state championship in program history.

Notable students
Rebecca Gayheart - fashion model and television and film actress

References

Schools in Knott County, Kentucky
Public high schools in Kentucky
Hindman, Kentucky